The Microsystems Technology Office (MTO) is one of seven current organizational divisions of DARPA, an agency responsible for the development of new technology for the United States Armed Forces. It is sometimes referred to as the Microelectronics Technology Office.

The office focuses on development of microelectromechanical systems (MEMS), electronics, algorithms, systems architecture, and photonics.

History
MTO was established by Arati Prabhakar. It is currently led by Director Dr. Mark Rosker.

Projects

A detailed description of each project is available on the DARPA/MTO website
 Adaptive radar Countermeasures (ARC) https://www.darpa.mil/program/adaptive-radar-countermeasures
 Adaptive Focal Plane Array (AFPA)
 Adaptive RF Technologies (ART) https://www.darpa.mil/program/adaptive-rf-technologies
 Advanced Wide FOV Architectures for Image Reconstruction and Exploitation (AWARE) https://www.darpa.mil/program/advanced-wide-fov-architectures-for-image-reconstruction-and-exploitation
 Advanced X-Ray Integrated Sources (AXiS)
 Analog Logic (AL)
 Analog-to-Information (A-TO-I) Look Through
 Architecture for Diode High Energy Laser Systems (ADHELS)
 Black Diamond
 Carbon Electronics for RF Applications (CERA)
 Casimir Effect Enhancement (CEE)
 Centers in Integrated Photonics Engineering Research (CIPHER)
 Chip to Chip Optical Interconnects (C2OI)
 Chip-Scale Atomic Clocks (CSAC)
 Chip-Scale Vacuum Micro Pumps (CSVMP)
 Compact Mid-Ultraviolet Technology (CMUVT)
 Compact Ultra-Stable Gyro for Absolute Reference (COUGAR)
 DARPA/ONR Field-Reversible Thermal Connector (RevCon) Challenge
 Data in Optical Domain Network (DOD-N)
 Dialysis-Like Therapeutics (DLT)
 Discharge Excited Catalytic Oxygen Iodine Laser (DECOIL)
 Diverse Accessible Heterogeneous Integration (DAHI) https://www.darpa.mil/program/diverse-accessible-heterogeneous-integration
 Dynamic Range-enhanced Electronics and Materials (DREaM) https://www.darpa.mil/program/dynamic-range-enhanced-electronics-and-materials
 Efficient Linearized All-Silicon Transmitter ICs (ELASTx)
 Electric Field Detector (E-FED)
 EXCALIBUR  https://www.darpa.mil/program/excalibur
 Focus Center Research Program (FCRP)
 Gratings of Regular Arrays and Trim Exposures (GRATE)
 Guaranteed Architecture for Physical Security (GAPS)
 Hemispherical Array Detector for Imaging (HARDI)
 High Frequency Integrated Vacuum Electronics (HIFIVE)
 High Operating Temperature Mid Wave Infrared (HOTMWIR)
 High Productivity Computing Systems (HPCS)
 Hybrid Insect Micro-Electro-Mechanical Systems (Hi-MEMS)
 In Vivo Nanoplatforms (IVN)
 Integrity and Reliability of Integrated Circuits (IRIS)
 Intrachip/Interchip Enhanced Cooling (ICECool) https://www.darpa.mil/program/intrachip-interchip-enhanced-cooling
 Leading Edge Access Program (LEAP)
 Living Foundries
 Low Cost Thermal Imager (LCTI-M) https://www.darpa.mil/program/low-cost-thermal-imager-manufacturing
 Maskless Nanowriter
 Mesodynamic Architectures (Meso)
 Micro Cryogenic Coolers (MCC)
 Micro Isotope Power Sources (MIPS)
 Microscale Plasma Devices (MPD)
 Micro-Technology for Positioning, Navigation and Timing (Micro-PNT)
 Nano Electro Mechanical Computers (NEMS)
 Nanoscale Architecture for Coherent Hyper-Optic Sources (NACHOS)
 NEMS MEMS Science and Technology Fundamentals
 Nitride Electronic NeXt-Generation Technology (NEXT)
 Non Volatile Logic (NV LOGIC)
 Optical Radiation Cooling and Heating in Integrated Devices (ORCHID)
 Photon Counting Arrays (PCAR)
 Photonically Optimized Embedded Microprocessors (POEM)  https://www.darpa.mil/program/photonically-optimized-embedded-microprocessors
 Power Efficiency Revolution for Embedded Computing Technologies (PERFECT) https://www.darpa.mil/program/power-efficiency-revolution-for-embedded-computing-technologies
 Quantum Entanglement Science and Technology (QUEST)
 Reliable Neural-Interface Technology (RE-NET)
 RF Photonic Technologies (RPT)
 Self HEALing Mixed Signal Integrated Circuits (HEALICS)
 Sensor Tape
 Short-Range, Wide Field-of-View Extremely agile, Electronically Steered Photonic Emitter (SWEEPER)
 Spin Torque Transfer Random Access Memory (STT-RAM)
 Thermal Management Technologies (TMT)
 THz Electronics
 Tip Based Nanofabrication (TBN)
 Trusted Integrated Circuits (TRUST)
 Ubiquitous High Performance Computing (UHPC)
 Ultrabeam

References

External links
 

DARPA offices